Yarang is a district (amphoe) of Pattani province, southern Thailand.

History
The old district office was in Ban Ano Bulo, Tambon Yarang. However, as the old location was flooded every year, the office was moved to Ban Bin Ya Limo on 10 February 1930. The present office was opened on 22 September 1996.

Geography
Neighboring districts are (from the south clockwise) Raman and Mueang Yala of Yala province, Mae Lan, Nong Chik, Mueang Pattani, Yaring, Mayo, and Thung Yang Daeng of Pattani Province.

Economy
Tambon Khao Toom in the district is the site of Fort Sirindhorn, home of the Internal Security Operations Command Area 4.

Administration
The district is divided into 12 sub-districts (tambons), which are further subdivided into 72 villages (mubans). Yarang is a township (thesaban tambon) which parts of the tambon Yarang and Pitu Mudi. There are a further 12 tambon administrative organizations (TAO).

References

External links
amphoe.com

Districts of Pattani province